Paattum Bharathamum is a 1975 Indian Tamil-language musical dance film, directed and produced by P. Madhavan. The film stars Sivaji Ganesan, Jayalalithaa, Sripriya and Vijayakumar. It was released on 6 December 1975.

Plot 
Shanmugasundaram and Meenakshi are a artistic couple who get broken up due to differences. Their daughter Lalitha, who sides with Shanmugam, is now an accomplished dancer. Arun meets her accidentally and mocks her skills to which she responds that anyone can become rich in a day by being lucky but it takes real talent to become an artist. Taking this as a challenge, he joins Meenakshi and learns to dance facing Lalitha in a competition defeating her. They fall in love too.

While Thiyagarajan acts like he is ok with his son's choice, he uses his nephew Kumar to drive a wedge between them by making it look like Lalitha is of poor character causing Arun to insult Shanmugasundaram. When Arun finds out the truth, it is too late and he leaves his father and the riches dedicating the rest of his life to art. How the same art becomes instrumental in reuniting them through Shanthi is the rest of the story.

Cast 
Sivaji Ganesan as Ravisankar/Arun
Jayalalithaa as Lalitha
Sripriya as Shanthi
Vijayakumar as Kumar
Major Sundarrajan as Thiyagarajan
Sukumari as Meenakshi
R. S. Manohar as Shanmugasundaram
M. R. R. Vasu as Kuduvancherry Kuppusamy
Manorama as Mohana
Gopi Krishna as Dancer
Veeraraghavan
Samikannu as School Principal
Pakoda Kadhar as Kuduvancherry Kuppusamy Assistant

Soundtrack 
The music was composed by M. S. Viswanathan, with lyrics by Kannadasan.

Reception 
Kanthan of Kalki noted that, regardless of how good the story was, the dialogues were entertaining.

References

External links 
 

1970s dance films
1970s musical films
1970s Tamil-language films
1975 films
Films directed by P. Madhavan
Films scored by M. S. Viswanathan
Indian dance films
Indian musical films